Atanasie is a Romanian male name that may refer to:

Atanasie Anghel
Atanasie Marian Marienescu
Atanasie Rednic

Romanian masculine given names